Oku is a subdivision in North West Region, (formerly North West Province), Cameroon. The term Oku also refers to the people who live in this region ruled by a Paramount Monarch [HRM King Ngum IV. Ngum Ernest Merlin Shang] and the primary language that they speak (although English is also widely spoken). Oku is a rural area containing about 36 villages with the population of about 180,000 inhabitants . Oku also has a Sub-divisional hospital. However, three mobile telephone networks (MTN, ORANGE, CAMTEL) are available in Oku. As such, mobile internet facilities are available.

Geography and climate
It is not cold enough for snow, but at night during the dry season temperatures drop below human comfort range. Mount Oku, a stratovolcano, reaches a height of 3011 metres (9880 feet) and is the second highest mountain of Cameroon after Mount Fako (better known as Mount Cameroon).

The broader Oku or Foumbot volcanic field also includes many scoria cones and maars, several of which are filled by crater lakes. Lake Oku is a crater lake. Two of the crater lakes, Lake Nyos and Lake Monoun, have been the subject of extensive research. Quantities of gas build up in the lakes and are occasionally released; being heavier than air, they pour down the mountainside and can suffocate entire villages. Some of the locals believe that a god lives in the lake and must be appeased.

The region is an important one for biodiversity, especially the Kelum mountain Forest.

Oku has many well graded earth road linking its various villages and neighbouring subdivisions like Noni, Babessi and Kumbo central, although none of them would be called good by most Westerners.
Oku has recently got a road link through Babungo from Bamenda. One can now take two hours from Bamenda through Ibal Oku, Mbockevuh, Mawes*lake oku* through Tolon, Chiar, Ikal to Elak and to Banso.

Economy
Oku is characterized by subsistence farming. There is a shortage of arable land, and the people farm even the steep hillsides. A typical practice is to plant beans, corn, and potatoes together in the same furrows. There is also a lot of bee farming in OKU and Oku is the only area in the whole of Cameroon that produces the natural white honey and has an Oku Honey Cooperative to manage and sell what bee farmers harvest."One of the first three products is Oku white honey from the Republic of Cameroon (Cameroon), which is produced in the nationally protected forest of Kilum Ijim near Mount Oku (French Agricultural Research Centre for International Development (CIRAD), 2013). As one of Cameroon’s first registered GIs, producers and cooperatives involved in the production of Oku white honey are hoping that their product can eventually compete on an international level with the likes of other well-known GIs and spur economic development."

Religion

The religion of the region is predominantly a mixture of assorted local traditional beliefs (chiefly ancestor worship, also animism and paganism) with diluted forms of Christianity (mostly Baptist and Catholic, but also Lutheran and Charismatic; the Church of the Brethren are also represented).

As of 2004, the former Fon (i.e., the traditional king of the people, but with no formal political power), who has a Baptist background, was attempting some religious reforms, to move the people away from some of the more un-Christian traditional practices; these reforms have met with considerable resistance given that the present fon (Fon Sentieh II) .

The shrines in Oku are Lumetu, Yicham, Wuchia. Lumetu is famous because it houses the second grave of the legendary Mnkong Moteh.
An example of Oku palaces is the Mbokenkfey palace (NtokeMbokenkfey).

References

Volcanoes of Cameroon
Maars of Cameroon
Northwest Region (Cameroon)